Wang Yingfan (born April 1942) is a Chinese diplomat who served as Permanent Representative of China to the United Nations from 2000 to 2003. He was also the Chinese Ambassador to the Philippines from 1985 to 1990.

Biography 
Wang Yingfan was born in the Inner-Mongolia Autonomous Region of the People's Republic of China in April 1942. Wang graduated from Beijing Foreign Studies University. Wang served as Permanent Representative of China to the United Nations from 2000 to 2003. Wang was Vice-Chairman of the National People's Congress Foreign Affairs Committee from 2003 to 2008. Wang is married and has a daughter.

References 

1942 births
Living people
Permanent Representatives of the People's Republic of China to the United Nations
Ambassadors of China to the Philippines
Members of the Standing Committee of the 10th National People's Congress
People's Republic of China politicians from Inner Mongolia
People from Hinggan League
Members of the Preparatory Committee for the Hong Kong Special Administrative Region